Asota plagiata, the two-spots tiger moth, is a moth of the family Erebidae first described by Francis Walker in 1854. It is found in the northern half of Australia.

The wingspan is 49–58 mm.

The larvae feed on Ficus macrophylla.

References

Asota (moth)
Moths of Australia
Moths described in 1854